Rubus longii, also known as Long's blackberry, is an uncommon North American species of brambles in the rose family. It grows in the eastern United States from Long Island to North Carolina.

Rubus longii is an erect shrub with straight prickles. Leaves are palmately compound with 3 or 5 leaflets. Fruits are nearly spherical, black and juicy.

The genetics of Rubus is extremely complex, so that it is difficult to decide on which groups should be recognized as species. There are many rare species with limited ranges such as this. Further study is suggested to clarify the taxonomy.

References

External links
 

longii
Plants described in 1938
Flora of the Eastern United States